Candidia barbata is a species of cyprinid in the genus Candidia. It is endemic to Taiwan.

References

Cyprinidae
Fish of Taiwan
Cyprinid fish of Asia